The 2004 FIBA Diamond Ball was a basketball tournament held in Heraklion, Greece, from August 5 until August 8, 2004. The FIBA Diamond Ball was an official international basketball tournament organised by FIBA, held every Olympic year prior to the Olympics. It was the 1st edition of the FIBA Diamond Ball. The six participating teams were Australia, China host Greece, Brazil, Nigeria and South Korea.

The United States women's team did not participate in the 2004 event although they were  the then-reigning World champions and Olympic champions.

Participating teams

 – Oceania champions
 – Americas champions
 – Asian champions
 – African champions
 – Olympics host
 – European champions → replaced by  – Asia Cup 3rd place (China were Asia Cup champions)

Preliminary round

Group A
All times are local Central European Summer Time (UTC+2).

|}

Group B
All times are local Central European Summer Time (UTC+2).

|}

Final round
All times are local Central European Summer Time (UTC+2).

5th place

Third place

Final

Final standings
The final standings per FIBA official website:

References

External links 
2004 FIBA Diamond Ball Archive

FIBA competitions between national teams
 
Recurring sporting events established in 2004
Women's basketball competitions between national teams
World championships in basketball